The Green Mountain Conference was a short-lived intercollegiate athletic football conference that existed only during the 1963 season. The league had members, as its name suggests, in the state of Vermont.

Champions
1963 – Vermont

See also
List of defunct college football conferences

References

Defunct college sports conferences in the United States
College sports in Vermont